Suspect is a 1960 British thriller film directed by Roy Boulting and John Boulting and starring Tony Britton, Virginia Maskell, Peter Cushing, Ian Bannen and Donald Pleasence. Based on the 1949 novel A Sort of Traitors by Nigel Balchin, it was filmed on a limited budget at Shepperton in seventeen days. The film was released in the United States as The Risk.

It was shot at Shepperton Studios with sets designed by art director Albert Witherick.

Premise
A young scientist's pioneering work and his acquaintance with subversive anti-government groups attract the attention of the authorities.

Cast
 Tony Britton as Bob Marriott
 Virginia Maskell as Lucy Byrne
 Peter Cushing as Professor Sewell
 Ian Bannen as Alan Andrews
 Raymond Huntley as Sir George Gatling
 Thorley Walters as Mr Prince
 Donald Pleasence as Brown
 Spike Milligan as Arthur
 Kenneth Griffith as Dr Shole
 Robert Bruce as Levers
 Anthony Booth as Parkin
 Basil Dignam as Dr Childs
 Brian Oulton as Director
 Sam Kydd as Slater
 John Payne as Iverson
 Margaret Lacey as Mr Prince's secretary
 Bruce Wightman as Phil, the barman
 Ian Wilson as Pin-Table man
 Murray Melvin as Teddy Boy
 Geoffrey Bayldon as Rosson
 André Charisse as Heller

Critical reception
The Times wrote, "the film is produced and directed by Mr. Roy and Mr. John Boulting; they have made a workmanlike job of what was a workmanlike book". TV Guide later wrote, "at times it is highly crafted, and the careful planning behind the production comes through well. However, the rapid shoot and low budget occasionally give this the look of a made-for-television film, and despite the tautness of the direction, the story is merely a routine thriller."

References

External links

1960 films
1960s thriller films
British thriller films
1960s English-language films
Films based on British novels
Films directed by Roy Boulting
Films directed by John Boulting
British Lion Films films
Films shot at Shepperton Studios
Films with screenplays by Nigel Balchin
1960s British films